The discography of Magnapop—an American rock band from Atlanta, Georgia—consists of five studio albums, one live album, four extended plays, and six singles.

First forming in 1989 under the name Homemade Sister, the group is primarily composed of singer/songwriter Linda Hopper and guitarist/songwriter Ruthie Morris. The Homemade Sister line-up of the band only recorded a demo tape and the single "Rip the Wreck"/"Merry". Magnapop first achieved fame in the European festival circuit and had their biggest commercial success in the mid-1990s with the minor hits "Slowly, Slowly" and "Open the Door" from the albums Hot Boxing and Rubbing Doesn't Help, respectively.

Albums

Studio albums

Live albums

Extended plays

Singles

B-sides

The following songs do not appear on a Magnapop album or a compilation featuring the band:

Music videos

Soundtracks

Tributes

Various artist compilations

Radio sessions

References

External links

Magnapop at Discogs

Alternative rock discographies
Discographies of American artists
Discography
Rock music group discographies
Punk rock discographies